A leotard is a unisex skin-tight one-piece garment that covers the torso from the crotch to the shoulder. The garment was made famous by the French acrobatic performer Jules Léotard (1838–1870). There are sleeveless, short-sleeved, and long-sleeved leotards. A variation is the unitard, which also covers the legs.

Leotards are worn by acrobats, gymnasts, dancers, figure skaters, athletes, actors, wrestlers, and circus performers both as practice garments and performance costumes. They are often worn with ballet skirts on top and tights or sometimes bike shorts as underwear. As a casual garment, a leotard can be worn with a belt; it can also be worn under overalls or short skirts.

Leotards are entered by stepping into the legs and pulling the sleeves over the shoulders. Scoop-necked leotards have wide neck openings and are held in place by the elasticity of the garment. Others are crew necked or polo necked and close at the back of the neck with a zipper or snaps.

Use

Leotards are used for a variety of purposes, including yoga, exercise, dance (particularly for ballet and/or modern), as pajamas, for additional layered warmth under clothing, and for recreational and casual wear. They may form a part of children's dressing up and play outfits and can also be worn as a top.

Leotards are commonly worn in figure skating, postwar modern dance, acrobatic rock'n'roll, traditional ballet and gymnastics, especially by young children.  Practice leotards and those worn in podium training sessions are usually sleeveless. Female competition garments for gymnastics and skating are almost always long-sleeved, while male competition leotards may be sleeved or sleeveless, the latter more common in gymnastics, the former in figure skating. Leotards come in many styles — either with a full seated bottom or as a thong or T-front thong for maximum comfort and avoidance of visible panty lines when worn under leggings or tights.

History

The first known use of the name leotard came only in 1886, many years after Jules Léotard's death. Léotard himself called the garment a maillot, which is a general French word for different types of tight-fitting shirts or sports shirts. In the early 20th century, leotards were mainly confined to circus and acrobatic shows, worn by the specialists who performed these acts.

The 1920s and 1930s saw leotards influencing the style of swimsuits, with women's one-piece swimsuits today still being similar in appearance to leotards.

Leotards are worn by professional dancers such as the showgirls of Broadway. Stage use of the leotard typically coordinates the garment with stockings or tights.

In the 1950s, traditionally-styled leotards continued to be worn mainly by stage performers and circus actors, but leotards began to be used as simple and functional exercise garments, often in institutional settings like schools and in fitness training. These were almost always black and worn together with thick tights. Between 1950 and 1970, leotards remained as such in appearance until a style change in the 1970s, with more colorful leotards appearing on the scene, most often in ballet and exercise.

During the 1970s and 1980s, leotards were extensively used as clothing for aerobic exercises, eventually displaced in the 1990s by Lycra pants similar to those used in cycling uniforms and in the 2000s they were replaced completely by trousers and leggings (tight clothing which cover the legs made of spandex and denim). It continues to be also worn by women cyclists and athletes in competitions.

Crossover to fashion activewear

By the late 1970s, leotards had become common both as exercise and street wear, popularized by the disco craze, and aerobics fashion craze of the time. These leotards were produced in a variety of nylon and spandex materials, as well as the more traditional cotton previously used for uni-colored leotards and tights. Exercise videos by celebrities such as Jane Fonda also did much to popularize the garment. The dancewear company Danskin flourished during this period, producing a wide variety of leotards for both dance and street wear. Other companies, such as Gilda Marx, produced leotards during this time period then ceased production when they ceased to be in fashion. By the late 1980s, leotards for exercise wear had become little more than bikini bottoms with straps over the shoulders, generally worn with cropped shirts. From the mid-1980s to mid 90s, leotards usually cap sleeved style or sometime in colder weather a long sleeved turtleneck style both popularly worn as tops with jeans especially skinny jeans and high waisted ankle length mom jeans, under shortalls or with casual  or dress pants as part of everyday wear.  They were also worn with skirts outfits. By the mid-1990s, leotards had been almost completely replaced for exercise wear by the sports bra and shorts.

Leotards are a versatile garment that can either be dressed up or dressed down. The illustration of Beyoncé shows a stage costume that has been heavily embellished with sequins and sparkles.

Among exercise garments, leotards may be seen along with other types of garments, such as T-shirts, crop tops and tights.

Gymnastics attire

Women

For females, the standard gymnastic competition uniform is a leotard. Traditionally, competition leotards have always had long sleeves; however, half-length sleeved and sleeveless garments are now permitted under the Code of Points and have been worn by teams at the World Gymnastics Championships and other major events. Practice leotards and those worn in podium training sessions are generally sleeveless.

In the 1970s, leotards were typically made from polyester and related fabrics. Since the 1980s, however, they have been made from lycra or spandex. Since the 1990s, leotards have become more elaborate and have employed a variety of textiles, including velvet, velour, mesh, metallic fabrics, foils and iridescent "hologram" fabric. They can also be decorated with rhinestones, and metallic jewels that are heat-set onto the garments and will not fall or wash off.

Leotards cannot be cut above hip height or be cut past the shoulder blades, back or front. Any leotard that is somewhat see-through is also against the rules. Usage of white tights is not standard. In rare instances, gymnasts and teams have been penalized with score deductions for their attire.

Men

For competitions, male gymnasts wear two layers of clothing. The first, a singlet (or comp shirt, short for competition shirt) is a sleeveless leotard. For floor and vault, gymnasts wear a pair of very short shorts over the singlet. For their other events, they wear a pair of long pants, attached to the bottom of the feet with stirrups.

Unlike women's uniforms, which generally employ metallic or iridescent fabrics, men's uniforms are usually matte-colored and less ornate. Singlets usually employ one or more of the national team colors, but there are no restrictions on design. Shorts and pants are generally a solid color, usually white, blue, red or black.

History
Olympic gymnastics team leotards have dramatically changed from their first memorable designs. Over time, the emphasis on what leotards are intended to do has changed. Originally, the intent was to cover as much of a woman's body as possible, while today, leotards must breathe, improve aerodynamics and seamlessly re-shape as female athletes bend, twist and contort their way through increasingly difficult routines.

Men's leotards
When Jules Léotard created the maillot, it was intended for men. This style of leotard can be seen in early 20th century photos of the circus 'strong man'. Men's leotards evolved along with the women's style, eventually resembling it, except that the men's version had a slightly lower-cut leg opening and a lower-cut front.

Unlike their female counterparts, however, men's leotards come in two styles—either with a full seated bottom or as a thong. The reason for this is apparent when worn with tights such as in ballet, where lines created by the garment underneath the tights would look unsightly. In such instances, a dance belt is also worn.

Leotards are commonly worn by male dancers (particularly for ballet) and gymnasts. Leotard-like garments (often of the "biketard" or singlet type) are also often worn by men in sports such as rowing, wrestling, cycling and running, to maintain a tight fit and stop the upper part of the clothing from running up.

See also
 Athleisure
 Bodystocking
 Bodysuit
 Catsuit
 Jumpsuit
 Spandex
 Spandex fetishism
 Sportswear
 Underwear as outerwear
 Wrestling singlet

References

External links
 

1980s fashion
2010s fashion
Costume design
Dancewear
History of clothing (Western fashion)
History of fashion
Hosiery
One-piece suits
Sportswear
Tops (clothing)
Undergarments